It's Only Natural is the third studio album by American pop rock band The Higher, released on June 23, 2009.

Track listing
"Try Again" – 3:31
"Other Options" – 3:35
"Undertaker" – 3:01
"It's Only Natural" – 3:15
"Story of a Man Obsessed" – 3:12
"The (Runaway) Artist" – 3:42
"Play with Fire" – 3:39
"Burn and Turn" – 3:01
"The Black Dress" – 3:29
"Beautiful Coffin" – 3:49
"Scandalous" – 7:04
"Closer" (Ne-Yo cover) – 4:04

Bonus tracks
"Sound the Retreat" (iTunes bonus track)

References

2009 albums
The Higher albums
Epitaph Records albums